Cristian Garín defeated Facundo Bagnis in the final, 6–4, 6–7(3–7), 7–5 to capture the men's singles tennis title at the 2021 Chile Open.

Thiago Seyboth Wild was the defending champion, but chose not to defend his title.

Seeds
The top four seeds received a bye into the second round.

Draw

Finals

Top half

Bottom half

Qualifying

Seeds

Qualifiers

Qualifying draw

First qualifier

Second qualifier

Third qualifier

Fourth qualifier

References 
Main draw
Qualifying draw

2021 ATP Tour
2021 Singles